Ouyen  is a town in Victoria, Australia, located in the Rural City of Mildura at the junction of the Calder Highway and Mallee Highway,  south of Mildura, and  northwest of Melbourne. At the 2016 census, the town had a population of 1,045.

History
The area was first occupied by the Wergaia Indigenous Australians. The name is believed to be derived from the Wergaia word "wuya-wuya", which some believe means "pink-eared duck", whilst others claim it means "ghost waterhole".

The town was established around the Ouyen railway station, built in 1906 on the Mildura Line. The Post Office opened on 22 October 1907.
It is also the junction for a railway line west parallel to the Mallee Highway. This line is in poor condition and used only for collecting grain from silos in small towns between Ouyen and the South Australian border, as the Victorian part is broad gauge, but the line from Pinnaroo to Tailem Bend has been converted to standard gauge, with no facility for handling the break of gauge. The line was used for interstate freight and The Overland as a broad gauge connection while the main Melbourne to Adelaide line (through Bordertown) was being converted from broad to standard gauge in 1995.

Property became available for purchase in 1911, and much of it was cleared for sheep grazing, and crops of wheat and oats.

Present
Ouyen is the commercial, cultural and transport centre for the surrounding grain farming region. Trucks bring grain to the silos at harvest time to be railed to Portland or Adelaide, South Australia for shipping, or to flour mills for processing.

Ouyen has an Australian rules football team, Ouyen United, competing in the Sunraysia Football League.

Golfers play at the Ouyen Golf Club on Daker Street. The clubhouse also houses the Ouyen Tennis Club which hosts an annual grass court tournament on the March labour day weekend.

Ouyen Lake, a 14.3 hectare man-made lake at the site of the old Ouyen reservoir, was opened 5 October 2018. The Ouyen Lake Project is a community initiative with labour provided by local volunteers and funding sourced from donations. The lake is used for recreational activities including fishing and Wakeboarding.

Culture
Between 1998 and 2011 the Great Australian Vanilla slice Triumph was held in Ouyen. Judging criteria include "when tasted, should reveal a custard with a creamy smooth texture and a balance of vanilla taste with a crisp, crunchy pastry topped with a smooth and shiny glaze/fondant".

The town also hosts an Autumn Art Show in April and the Mallee Wildflower Festival in October. It was the location for the 2003 Ouyen Raindance where 500 women danced naked in a secret location in an attempt to raise the spirits of the town suffering from a prolonged drought.

The Roxy Theatre, in the main street, Oke Street, was built in 1936 and owned by Hugh Ingwersen, a local business man. The theatre is a historically significant building (being one of six of its kind left in Australia) being of a tropical style (high ceilings and shutters which open along both sides to allow for airflow). It closed in 1971. After a major community project the Roxy re-opened in 2007 with a gala opening featuring Bill Hunter and Neil Paine as the guest speakers and 150 guests. Volunteers run the theatre on behalf of the community.

The town is the site of the Big Mallee Root, symbolising the time when the roots of Eucalyptus dumosa were a mainstay of the economy of soldier settlers of the area, being collected for sale as firewood.

Ouyen has a reunion of past and present residents on the second Sunday of February each year at Fitzroy Gardens, Melbourne usual time at 11am at the south western corner of the gardens.

A special anniversary on Sunday, 9 February 2014 marked the 50th gathering at the venue. The town has big art scenes with sculptures, modern and contemporary artworks appearing in the gallery and around the town.

Australian folk rock band, Weddings Parties Anything, name-checks Ouyen in their 1987 song, "Hungry Years", from their debut album, Scorn of the Women. "Hungry Years" describes itinerant fruit pickers travelling via train up to Mildura.

Climate
Ouyen has a semi-arid climate and a Köppen climate classification of BSk with hot summers and cool winters . There is a wetter tendency in winter and early spring, which have the most precipitation days.

References

14.  For more information about the   Ouyen reunion in the Fitzroy Gardens go to https://www.facebook.com/groups/1818178355102357/

External links

Towns in Victoria (Australia)
Mallee (Victoria)